Forever is the second studio album by Jamaican musician Popcaan. It was released on July 20, 2018 via Mixpak Records. Production was primarily handled by Andrew "Dre Skull" Hershey, who also served as executive producer. It features a sole guest appearance from Davido.

In the United States, the album entered the Billboard 200 at number 171 and reached number 2 on the Reggae Albums chart. Popcaan headlined Reggae Sumfest on the day of the album's release, and toured in support of the album to arenas across the United Kingdom and Canada.

Critical reception

Forever was met with generally favorable reviews from critics. At Metacritic, which assigns a normalized rating out of 100 to reviews from mainstream publications, the album received an average score of 74 based on six reviews. The aggregator AnyDecentMusic? has the critical consensus of the album at a 6.3 out of 10, based on eight reviews. The aggregator Album of the Year assessed the critical consensus as 68 out of 100, based on 6 reviews.

Accolades

Track listing

Personnel
Andrae "Popcaan" Sutherland – vocals, A&R
David Adedeji "Davido" Adeleke – vocals (track 13)
Andrew "Dre Skull" Hershey – producer (tracks: 1-5, 8-11, 13, 16), executive producer, A&R
Markus "Markus Records" Myrie – producer (track 6)
Ainsley "Notnice" Morris – producer (tracks: 7, 12, 14, 17)
Damian "Mini E5" Gager – producer (track 15)
Gareth Keane – producer (track 15)
Ryan Griffiths – producer (track 15)
Mark "Exit" Goodchild – mixing (tracks: 1-8, 10-12, 14-17)
Leslie Brathwaite – mixing (tracks: 9, 13)
Chris Athens – mastering
Susannah Webb – creative direction, A&R
Phillip T. Annand – art direction
Ivar Wigan – photography

Charts

References

External links

2018 albums
Popcaan albums